The Indian Journal of Ophthalmology is a peer-reviewed open-access medical journal published on behalf of the All India Ophthalmological Society. The journal publishes articles on ophthalmology and vision science.

Abstracting and indexing 
The journal is indexed in Abstracts on Hygiene and Communicable Diseases, Biological Abstracts, BIOSIS Previews, CAB Abstracts, CINAHL, EBSCO, Excerpta Medica/EMBASE, Expanded Academic ASAP, Global Health, Health & Wellness Research Center, Health Reference Center Academic, MEDLINE/Index Medicus, PubMed, SafetyLit, Science Citation Index Expanded, SCOLOAR, Scopus, SIIC databases, SNEMB, Tropical Diseases Bulletin, and Ulrich's  Periodicals Directory.

References

External links 
 
 Archive of IJO

Open access journals
Bimonthly journals
English-language journals
Medknow Publications academic journals
Ophthalmology journals
Publications established in 1953
Academic journals associated with learned and professional societies of India